Li Jinqing (born 5 January 1997) is a Chinese footballer who plays as a midfielder for China League One club Sichuan Jiuniu.

Club career
Li Jinqing signed with second tier football club Shenzhen on 27 February 2018 for the 2018 China League One season. He made his debut in a league game on 11 March 2018 against Heilongjiang Lava Spring F.C. that ended in a 2-2 draw. He would go on to establish himself as a regular within the team and go on to gain promotion with the club at the end of his first season with Shenzhen.

On 25 March 2022, Li transferred to China League One club Sichuan Jiuniu.

Career statistics

Club

Notes

References

External links

1997 births
Living people
Chinese footballers
Chinese expatriate footballers
Association football midfielders
China League One players
Chinese Super League players
Segunda División B players
G.D. Tourizense players
Shenzhen F.C. players
CP Villarrobledo players
Sichuan Jiuniu F.C. players
Chinese expatriate sportspeople in Portugal
Expatriate footballers in Portugal
Chinese expatriate sportspeople in Spain
Expatriate footballers in Spain